Ruknuddīn Bārbak Shāh (r. 1459–1474) was the son and successor of Sultan Nasiruddin Mahmud Shah. Initially appointed as the governor of Satgaon during the reign of his father, Barbak ascended the throne of the Bengal Sultanate in 1459. He was the first ruler to give prominent roles in the Sultanate's administration to the Abyssinian community. Historian Aniruddha Ray credits Barbak Shah as the pioneer of urbanisation in Bengal.

Early life and ascension

Barbak was born into an aristocratic Bengali Muslim Sunni family known as the Ilyas Shahi dynasty that had founded the Bengal Sultanate in 1352 CE. Despite his family's long presence in the region, Barbak's ancestors were of Sistani origin, hailing from what is now eastern Iran and southern Afghanistan. His father, Sultan Nasiruddin Mahmud Shah, ruled Bengal for over twenty years.

During his father's reign, Barbak served as the Governor of Satgaon (Arsah Sajla Mankhbad). During his governorship in 1455, Ulugh Ajmal Khan established the Zafar Khan Ghazi Mosque in Tribeni. Barbak inherited the throne of the country in 1459 CE, after his father's death.

Reign

In 1459, Barbak upgraded Mahisantosh into a mint town known as Barbakabad. This acquisition helped his kingdom extended to the Buriganga river in north. In 1474, he re-established his authority in Chittagong. The extent of Barbak Shah's kingdom can be discovered through various inscriptions commemorating the construction of jame mosques and royal gates across Malda, Rajshahi, Rangpur, Chittagong, Dhaka, Sylhet, Mymensingh and for the first time, Barisal.

Barbak Shah was a patron of Bengali and Persian literature. During his time Zainuddin wrote his Rasul Bijay and Ibrahim Qawwam Faruqi composed a Persian lexicon Farhang-i-Ibrahim (known as Sharafnamah). Raimukuta Brhaspati Mishra, Maladhar Basu, Krittibas Ojha and Kuladhar were the most noted Hindu scholars that time.

Warfare
Barbak was the first ruler in Bengal to recruit large numbers of Habshis (Abyssinians) to the administration of the royal palace and army, which would eventually lead to a Habshi usurp permanently ending the Ilyas Shahi dynasty several years after Barbak's death. According to the 17th-century work Risalat ash-Shuhada, Raja Kapilendra Deva (r. 1434-1467) of the Gajapati Kingdom (present-day Orissa) invaded southern Bengal during the early years of Sultan Barbak's reign and managed to capture the fort of Mandaran. Barbak sent his military general, the Muslim missionary Shah Ismail Ghazi, who defeated the Gajapati army and recovered Fort Mandaran.

The Sultanate's next expedition was against Kameshwar of Kamarupa who had gained control of eastern Dinajpur. Barbak's army, again led by general Ismail Ghazi, suffered a heavy defeat in Mahisantosh, although Kameshwar was impressed by the general's spiritual characteristics and embraced Islam. In January 1474 CE however, Barbak executed Ismail Ghazi after a malicious instigation led by Bhandsi Rai, who commanded the Sultanate's Ghoraghat frontier. Rai had accused Ghazi of attempting to establish a separate independent kingdom with Kameshwar in the regained territory.

Barbak Shah was also known to have invaded Mithila (present-day Janakpur) and conquered the region. He appointed Kedar Rai as the governor of that region. He also invaded Hajiganj Fort and surroundings at Tirhut in 1468.

Death
Rukunuddin Barbak Shah died in 1474 after ruling Bengal for 15 years.

See also
 List of rulers of Bengal
 History of Bengal
 History of India

References

1474 deaths
Articles lacking sources from March 2009
Year of birth unknown
15th-century Indian monarchs
Ilyas Shahi dynasty
Sunni monarchs
15th-century Bengalis
15th-century Indian Muslims